Flora v. United States, 357 U.S. 63 (1958), affirmed on rehearing, 362 U.S. 145 (1960), was a case in which the Supreme Court of the United States held that a taxpayer generally must pay the full amount of an income tax deficiency assessed by the Commissioner of Internal Revenue before he may challenge its correctness by a suit in a federal district court for refund under 28 U.S.C. § 1346(a)(1). The Supreme Court agreed with the Commissioner of Internal Revenue, stating that the full payment rule requires the entire amount of an asserted deficiency to be paid before a refund suit may be maintained.

Importance
If the taxpayer chooses to pay less than the deficiency asserted, the taxpayer's only remedies are (A) a deficiency proceeding in the Tax Court or, (B) in a bankruptcy case, a determination under section 505(a) of the US Bankruptcy Code. That rule can be a problem for a taxpayer who lets the 90-day period (following the issuance of a statutory notice of deficiency, during which he may file a Tax Court petition) expire and then cannot fully pay because of insufficient assets.

See also
Chief Justice Warren
List of United States Supreme Court cases, volume 357

References

External links
 
 
 

United States Supreme Court cases
United States Supreme Court cases of the Warren Court
United States taxation and revenue case law
1958 in United States case law